Harmony Township is a township in Susquehanna County, Pennsylvania, United States. The population was 512 at the 2020 census.

Geography

History
The area was first settled in 1789 when a road was built to connect Stockport on the Delaware River to the Susquehanna River at Cascade Creek.

Harmony Township was formed in 1809 from parts of Willingborough (now Great Bend Twp) and New Milford Townships.  The present-day Ararat, Oakland, Jackson, and Thompson Townships were later split from parts of Harmony Township.  The borough of Susquehanna Depot was created in 1853 from part of Harmony Township.

Gustav, Charles, and Albert Stickley formed Stickley Brothers and Company in the unincorporated village of Brandt in 1883 after learning furniture-making from their uncle, Jacob Schlager, and his business partner, W. H. Brandt.  The 1880 US Census shows Barbara Stickley and her famous sons, Gustav and Charles Stickley living there as Chair Makers. Charles later owned the Stickley - Brandt Furniture Co, in Binghamton, NY.  Brother Gustav started his own furniture factory in Eastwood, New York in the late 1890s.  Brothers Leopold and John George   started the L. & J.G. Stickley Furniture Co. in Fayetteville, NY in 1900. The L. & J.G. Stickley Furniture Company is currently located in Manlius, New York.

Joseph Smith
Harmony, Pennsylvania, is an important historical site in the Latter Day Saint movement. Latter Day Saints believe that Joseph Smith and Oliver Cowdery were visited by the angel of John the Baptist near Harmony in 1829, where he bestowed on Smith and Cowdery the Aaronic priesthood. Smith and Cowdery subsequently baptized one another in the Susquehanna River.

Other significant events occurred there during the periodic residence of Smith from 1825 to 1830. Harmony was the home of Isaac Hale, father of Smith's wife, Emma Hale. Smith and his father boarded with Isaac Hale in 1825 while working on Josiah Stowell's mining project. In December 1827, Smith and Emma moved to Harmony from Manchester, New York, to work on the Book of Mormon. Eventually they bought a small farm and house, where most of the Book of Mormon was produced between April 7 and early June 1829. The first convert baptism, that of Samuel H. Smith, took place there ten days after Smith and Cowdery had baptized each other. Somewhere between Harmony and Colesville, New York, Peter, James, and John bestowed upon Smith and Cowdery the Melchizedek priesthood. After the Church of Jesus Christ of Latter-day Saints was organized by Smith in 1830, Smith and Emma returned to Harmony and lived there through that summer. Fifteen revelations now found in the Doctrine and Covenants were received in Harmony.

The Harmony in Latter Day Saint history refers to a township rather than the village of Harmony. The township boundary was changed in 1853, placing the Latter Day Saint sites in present-day Oakland Township. The site of the Hale residence lies about a mile and a half west of present-day Oakland, Pennsylvania, in Susquehanna County, along the north side of Route 171.

Today the Church of Jesus Christ of Latter-day Saints owns about 288 acres at the Harmony location. On a small landscaped triangular plot located between the highway and a railroad right-of-way, a granite and bronze monument dedicated in 1960 commemorates the restoration of the Aaronic priesthood. The exact location of the restoration is not known.

The house owned by Joseph and Emma Smith burned in 1919. The buried foundation is just west of the monument. The graves of Isaac and Elizabeth Hale and of an infant son born to Joseph and Emma are close to Route 171, in a public cemetery located east of the Church property.  The Isaac and Elizabeth Hale and the Joseph and Emma Smith home have been restored by the Latter Day Saint church and a visitor center has been added.

Demographics

As of the census of 2010, there were 528 people, 214 households, and 151 families residing in the township.  The population density was 16.9 people per square mile (6.5/km2).  There were 350 housing units at an average density of 11.2/sq mi (4.4/km2).  The racial makeup of the township was 99% White, 0.2% Black, 0.2% American Indian, 0.2% Asian, 0.2% some other race and 0.2% two or more races. Hispanic or Latino of any race were 1.7% of the population.

There were 214 households, out of which 26.2% had children under the age of 18 living with them, 59.3% were married couples living together, 6.1% had a female householder with no husband present, and 29.4% were non-families. 20.6% of all households were made up of individuals, and 8% had someone living alone who was 65 years of age or older.  The average household size was 2.47 and the average family size was 2.76.

In the township, the population was spread out, with 17% under the age of 18, 65.4% from 18 to 64, and 17.6% who were 65 years of age or older.  The median age was 47.6 years.

The median income for a household in the township was $46,944, and the median income for a family was $78,750. Males had a median income of $40,208 versus $19,063 for females. The per capita income for the township was $29,827.  About 3.3% of families and 7.7% of the population were below the poverty line, including 8.1% of those under age 18 and 5.3% of those age 65 or over.

Communities and locations in Harmony Township
Melrose – A Hamlet Between Stevens Point and Starrucca.
Stevens Point – A hamlet between State Route 1011 and 1009.
Brandt – A hamlet crossing Starrucca Creek.
Jefferson Junction – A Locality between Brandt and Lanesboro on Starrucca Creek.
Bethel Hill – A hamlet south of the township on Route 171 next to Comfort Pond.
Riverview – A riverside community west of the township on Stateline RD next to Quarry RD.

References

Latter Day Saint movement in Pennsylvania
Townships in Susquehanna County, Pennsylvania
Significant places in Mormonism
Populated places established in 1789
Townships in Pennsylvania
1789 establishments in Pennsylvania